The marbled hatchetfish (Carnegiella strigata) is a small, normally  in length, freshwater ray-finned fish native to South America.  Hatchet shaped, it presents a gold line extending from its eye to its caudal fin while the area below has a brown and cream colored marble-like pattern (hence its name).

In the aquarium
The marbled hatchetfish is common in the aquarium industry.  Like most Amazonian fish, the species prefers softer, acidic water. As with most characins, they are omnivores. Hatchets have a tendency to be shy fish and are easily intimidated by larger or fast moving fish, so they are only appropriate for very peaceful communities or species tanks. The marbled hatchetfish is usually kept in small schools. It is necessary for tanks inhabited by these fish to have a tight lid, as they can jump out when startled. Marbled hatchetfish are egg scatterers and have been bred in the aquarium hobby.

Camouflage
Marbled hatchetfish are adapted to life in the Amazonian rivers as they resemble a dead leaf floating sideways on the surface of a body of water. This camouflage protects them against potential predators that may be lurking in the water. Their marble-like pattern is to give the illusion of rays of light breaking the waters surface and reflecting on the portrayed leaf. The fish itself does not move much, letting the waves and currents move it mostly, but with occasional brief twitching movements. This replicates the way a leaf would be blown around or carried away by the tide or a current. The line running from its eye, to its tail, is believed to replicate the midrib (midvein) of a leaf.

See also
List of freshwater aquarium fish species

References 
 
 
 Page 46, You & Your Aquarium, Dick Mills, Dorling Kindersley 
 Levy Carvalho Gomes, Richard Philip Brinn, Jaydione Luiz Marcon, Lucelle Araújo Dantas, Franmir Rodrigues Brandão, Janessa Sampaio de Abreu, Dawn Michelle McComb, Bernardo Baldisserotto. "Using EfinolL During Transportation of Marbled Hatchetfish, Carnegiella strigata (Günther)."  Aquatic Culture.  May 2008.

External links
Carnegiella strigata - Atlas Acuavida.com

Gasteropelecidae
Fish described in 1864
Taxa named by Albert Günther